Alfoncius Dapot Parulian Nainggolan (born 23 May 1983) also known as Cas or Casanova Alfonso, is an Indonesian R&B singer.

Career
R&B singer Cas, joined such other musicians as Manissedap, Sultan, Emil, Bembi, Rizki and Wizzow in 2006 to produce a solo album by the end of 2009. The album contained 12 singles. He performed songs inspired by his love, Rianti Cartwright, such as "Mingle With You" and "You Got What I Need". On this album, he worked with such musicians as Dewi Sandra, Manissedap, and Davadrian.

Marriage
He and Rianti Cartwright married on 17 September 2010 at Old St. Patrick's Cathedral, New York City. They announced an expected first child in february 2020; Cartwright gave birth to Cara Rose Kanaya, born on July 25, 2020.

Discography
Denganmu (With U; 2009)
Yang Terbaik (The Best; 2010)

See also
Batak

External links
  Cas Alfonso profile, Kapanlagi.com
  "Kehidupan Pribadi: 'Saya berharap semua orang bisa menghargai keputusan aku yang lebih ingin tertutup'", life.viva.co.id
  "Cas Sempat Buatkan Lagu Buat Dewi Sandra", musik.kapanlagi.com
  Foto Alfonso Nainggolan dan Rianti Cartwright, oktavita.com
  Rianti Cartwright, Beradaptasi Dengan Budaya Batak, nababan.wordpress.com
  Rianti & Cas: Tak Bisa Menahan Kangen, femina.co.id

References

1983 births
21st-century Indonesian male singers
Indonesian composers
Indonesian jazz singers
People from Jakarta
Indonesian Roman Catholics
People of Batak descent
Living people
Male jazz musicians